Not to be confused with Octonauts.

Subulina octona is a species of small, tropical, air-breathing land snail, a terrestrial pulmonate gastropod mollusk in the family Achatinidae.

Distribution 
The native distribution of this species includes:
 Caribbean
 Cuba
 Venezuela

This species has been introduced to and become established in:
 Tanzania
 Dominica
 Czech Republic as a "hothouse alien"
 Great Britain as a "hothouse alien"
 Pratas Island, Taiwan
 and other areas

Parasites 
Subulina octona serves as an intermediate host for:
 Postharmostomum gallinum
 Angiostrongylus cantonensis
 Platynosomum illiciens (syn.: P. fastosum)

See also
 List of introduced molluscs species of Venezuela
 List of molluscs of Falcón state, Venezuela
 List of non-marine molluscs of El Hatillo Municipality, Miranda, Venezuela

References

Further reading

External links 

Subulininae
Gastropods described in 1789